Stephen Dow Beckham is an American historian known for his work with Native Americans and the American West, especially the Pacific Northwest and the Lewis and Clark Expedition. He has authored many works, and is a Professor Emeritus of History at Lewis & Clark College in Portland, Oregon.

Beckham earned his bachelor's degree in history and biology at the University of Oregon in 1964. He earned a master's degree and PhD in history/anthropology at University of California, Los Angeles in 1966 and 1969, respectively. Since 1977 he has been teaching at Lewis & Clark College. Beckham is also a leading authority on Indian law. He has been called as an expert witness in many land-use issues, including reservations, casinos, and fishing rights. He also is the lead instructor for the Indian Law Summer Program at Lewis & Clark Law School.

Additionally, Beckham has helped to develop many museums and exhibits both in the Pacific Northwest and around the world. Some of his projects include The Literature of the Lewis and Clark Expedition touring exhibit, the Columbia Gorge Discovery Center in The Dalles, the National Historic Oregon Trail Interpretive Center in Baker City, The High Desert Museum in Bend, and Oregon, My Oregon at the Oregon Historical Society.

Selected bibliography
 George Gibbs, 1815-1873 : historian and ethnologist (1969)
 Coos Bay: The Pioneer Period, 1851-1890 (1973)
 Indians of Western Oregon: This Land Was Theirs (1977)
 Land of the Umpqua: A History of Douglas County, Oregon (1986)
 Tall Tales from Rogue River: The Yarns of Hathaway Jones (1990)
 Lewis & Clark College (1991)
 Many Faces: An Anthology of Oregon Autobiography (1993)
 Hoffman Construction Company: 75 Years of Building (1995)  
 Requiem for a People: The Rogue Indians and the Frontiersmen (1996)
 Lewis and Clark in Oregon Country: From the Rockies to the Pacific (2002)
 Literature of the Lewis and Clark Expedition (2003)
 Oregon Indians: Voices from Two Centuries (2006)

References

 Lewis and Clark College's Pamplin Society
 Lewis and Clark Law School

External links
 Oregon My Oregon at the Oregon Historical Society

Historians of the United States
Writers from Portland, Oregon
University of Oregon alumni
University of California, Los Angeles alumni
Lewis & Clark College faculty
Living people
21st-century American historians
21st-century American male writers
Year of birth missing (living people)
American male non-fiction writers